Arthur Lewbel (born c. 1956) is the inaugural Patrick Roche Professor of Economics at Boston College, and is known in the fields of applied microeconomics and econometrics.  He is an editor of Econometric Theory, former co-editor of the Journal of Business and Economic Statistics, a fellow of the Econometric Society, a fellow of the Journal of Econometrics, holds a Multa Scripsit award, and is ranked number 30 on Coupe's list of top economists in the world by publication. Lewbel's economic research is mainly in the areas of micro econometrics and in consumer demand analysis.

Lewbel holds a B.Sc. in mathematics from Massachusetts Institute of Technology (1978), and a doctorate in management (1984) from the same institution.

Lewbel is also known for his juggling contributions including "The Science of Juggling" published in Scientific American, and director and judge for the International Jugglers' Association's national juggling competitions.

References

External links 
 Lewbel’s home page at Boston College
working papers and publications
Lewbel’s history of Juggling
Lewbel’s juggling contributions

21st-century American economists
Boston College faculty
Fellows of the Econometric Society
Massachusetts Institute of Technology School of Science alumni
1950s births
Living people
Jugglers
MIT Sloan School of Management alumni